Martin Gardiner Bernal (10 March 1937 – 9 June 2013)
was a British scholar of modern Chinese political history. He was a Professor of Government and Near Eastern Studies at Cornell University. He is best known for his work Black Athena, a controversial work which argues that the culture, language, and political structure of Ancient Greece contained substantial influences from Egypt and Syria-Palestine.

Early life and education
Bernal was born and grew up in Hampstead, London, the son of the physicist John Desmond Bernal and artists' patron Margaret Gardiner. He was educated at Dartington Hall School and then at King's College, Cambridge, where he was awarded a degree in 1961 with first-class Honours in the Oriental Studies Tripos. At that time he specialised in the language and history of China, and spent some time at the Peking University. He carried on as a graduate student at Cambridge, and with the assistance of the Harkness Commonwealth Fellowship also at University of California, Berkeley and Harvard University, finishing his PhD in Cambridge in 1965 with thesis titled Chinese Socialism to 1913 when he was elected a fellow at King's.

Career
In 1972 Bernal moved to Cornell University in New York, United States. There he resided in the Telluride House as a faculty fellow, and became a full professor in 1988. He taught there for the rest of his career, retiring in 2001.

Initially he taught Government Studies at Cornell, and continued his research on modern Chinese history. Under the impact of the Vietnam War he had also developed an interest in Vietnamese history and culture, and learned the Vietnamese language.

From about 1975, however, Bernal underwent a radical shift in his interests. In his own words:
The scattered Jewish components of my ancestry would have given nightmares to assessors trying to apply the Nuremberg Laws, and although pleased to have these fractions, I had not previously given much thought to them or to Jewish culture. It was at this stage that I became intrigued—in a Romantic way—in this part of my 'roots'. I started looking into ancient Jewish history and— being on the periphery myself—into the relationship between the Israelites and the surrounding peoples, particularly the Canaanites and the Phoenicians. I had always known that the latter spoke Semitic languages, but it came as quite a shock to learn that Hebrew and Phoenician were mutually intelligible and that serious linguists treated both as a dialect of a single Canaanite language.During this time, I was beginning to study Hebrew and I found what seemed to me a number of striking similarities between it and Greek ...

Bernal came to the conclusion that ancient Greek accounts of Egyptian influence on their civilisation should be taken seriously. He had been interested in ancient Egypt since childhood, in part inspired by his grandfather Sir Alan Gardiner. Bernal's new direction was strengthened by his discovery of the work of Cyrus Gordon and Michael Astour. In due course he wrote Black Athena.

Bernal also wrote the book Cadmean Letters, devoted to the origins of the Greek alphabet. He devoted his next twenty years to writing the next two volumes of Black Athena, with the second volume devoted to archaeological and documentary evidence, and the third to linguistic evidence. He also spent considerable time defending his work.

He became Professor Emeritus upon his retirement in 2001.

Personal life
In 1961, Bernal married Judy Pace (later known as Judith Dunn). Together, they had one daughter and twin sons. They later divorced. His second wife, Leslie Miller-Bernal, and his five children survived him.

Books
  (pamphlet)

Responses
  (critical response)

Notes

References
 Nishikawa, Kinohi. "Martin Bernal", The Greenwood Encyclopedia of African American Literature. Ed. Hans Ostrom and J. David Macey, Jr. 5 vols. Westport, CT: Greenwood Press, 2005. . pp 114–15.

External links
 Martin Bernal page at Cornell University
 Martin Bernal short CV at Cornell University

1937 births
2013 deaths
Harvard University alumni
University of California, Berkeley alumni
American classical scholars
Classical scholars of Cornell University
Fellows of King's College, Cambridge
English classical scholars
British expatriate academics in the United States
Alumni of King's College, Cambridge
Scholars of ancient Greek history
People educated at Dartington Hall School
Afrocentrists
British people of Portuguese-Jewish descent
British people of Spanish-Jewish descent
British people of Italian-Jewish descent
American Book Award winners